Adam Antony Laughlin Hobbs (born October 29, 1993) is an American soccer player.

Career

College 
Hobbs began playing college soccer at Humboldt State University in 2011, but redshirted his first year and the 2012 season was cancelled at Humboldt State. Hobbs transferred to California State University, Northridge in 2013, where he played three seasons for the Matadors.

Professional 
In April 2016, Hobbs moved to German fourth-tier side Optik Rathenow, where he made eight appearances.

Following a period out of the game, Hobbs returned in August 2019, joining USL Championship side Las Vegas Lights. He made his professional debut on August 28, 2019, starting in a 1-1 draw with Tulsa Roughnecks.

References

External links 
 
 CSUN profile
 Humboldt State profile

1993 births
Living people
American soccer players
Association football goalkeepers
Cal State Northridge Matadors men's soccer players
FSV Optik Rathenow players
Las Vegas Lights FC players
Soccer players from California
USL Championship players
American expatriate soccer players